Following is a list of dams and reservoirs in Arizona.

All major dams are linked below.

Dams and reservoirs in Arizona

This list is incomplete.  You can help Wikipedia by expanding it.

 Alamo Dam, Alamo Lake, United States Army Corps of Engineers
 Ashfork-Bainbridge Steel Dam, Steel Dam Reservoir, privately owned
 Bartlett Dam, Bartlett Lake, United States Bureau of Reclamation
 Cave Buttes Dam, Cave Creek Reservoir, Flood Control District of Maricopa County
 Childs-Irving Hydroelectric Facilities, Stehr Lake, privately owned
 Coolidge Dam, San Carlos Lake, United States Bureau of Indian Affairs
 Davis Dam, Lake Mohave, USBR
 Gillespie Dam, unnamed reservoir, privately owned
 Glen Canyon Dam, Lake Powell, USBR
 Granite Basin Dam, Granite Basin Lake, United States Forest Service
 Granite Reef Diversion Dam, unnamed reservoir of the Salt River, USBR
 Headgate Rock Dam, unnamed reservoir, Flood Control District of Maricopa County
 Hoover Dam, Lake Mead, USBR
 Horse Mesa Dam, Apache Lake, USBR
 Horseshoe Dam, Horseshoe Lake, USBR
 Imperial Dam, Imperial Reservoir, USBR
 Laguna Diversion Dam, unnamed reservoir of the Colorado River, USBR (on California border)
 Lyman Dam, Lyman Reservoir, privately owned
 Morelos Dam, unnamed reservoir of the Colorado River, International Boundary and Water Commission (on Mexican border)
 Mormon Flat Dam, Canyon Lake, USBR
 New Cornelia Tailings Dam, largest US dam by volume, privately owned
 New Waddell Dam, Lake Pleasant, USBR
 Painted Rock Dam, Painted Rock Reservoir, USACE
 Palo Verde Dam, diversion dam on the Colorado River, USBR
 Parker Dam, Lake Havasu, USBR
 Stewart Mountain Dam, Saguaro Lake, USBR
 Theodore Roosevelt Dam, Theodore Roosevelt Lake, USBR

References 

 
 
Arizona
Dams